The JAM Message Base Format was one of the most popular file formats of message bases on DOS-based BBSes in the 1990s.  JAM stands for "Joaquim-Andrew-Mats" after the original authors of the API, Joaquim Homrighausen, Andrew Milner, Mats Birch, and Mats Wallin. Joaquim was the author of FrontDoor, a DOS-based FidoNet-compatible mailer. Andrew was the author of RemoteAccess, a popular DOS-based Bulletin Board System. JAM was originally released in 1993 in C, however the most popular implementation was Mark May's "MK Source for Msg Access" written in Pascal which also saw its initial release in 1993.

BBS software 
EleBBS
Ezycom
LoraBBS
MBSE
Mystic BBS
Nexus BBS
RemoteAccess
ProBoard
TAG (BBS)
TCRA32
Telegard
Tornado BBS

Mail import/export software 

 AllFix - File Tosser (can read control messages from and post messages into a JAM messagebase)
 Altair - FTN tosser
 Crashmail II - A portable FidoNet tosser for JAM messagebases
 FastEcho - FTN tosser
 FMail - FTN tosser
 GEcho - FTN tosser
 HPT (Fidonet) - FTN tosser
 IMail - FTN tosser
 Mystic BBS - BBS software with built in JAM import/export
 Partoss (Parma tosser) - FTN tosser
 Regina-Tosser/2
 TosScan - FTN tosser
 WaterGate
 xMail 1.00 - FTN tosser

Mail reading/editing software 
 FrontDoor FM - Sysop's local access reader/editor from FrontDoor package
 FrontDoor APX - Integrated reader/editor from FrontDoor APX package
 GoldED - Sysop's local access reader/editor
 Hector/DOS
 RAVIP
 ReadMsg - BBS door that replaces builtin message base option
 TheReader v4.50 - BBS door that replaces builtin message base option
 TimED - Sysop's local access reader/editor
 WebJammer

Offline QWK/Bluewave software 
 Bluewave
 Jc-QWK
 OffLine Message System (OLMS2000)

Mail posting tools 
(this software posts ASCII text files to JAM bases as messages)
 ChargePost
 JPost
 MPost
 PostIt - posts text files to local, netmail, and echomail areas
 RemoteAccess Automated Message System (RAMS) - posts welcome, thanks for the upload, and similar automated messages to users
 WriteJAM

Statistics tools 
(this software gathers statistical information)
 JAMStat - statistics bulletin generator
 MyMail
 QRatio
 ReadDetect
 Traffic v1.10

Maintenance tools 
 Automatic Maintenance Pro
 CVTMSG10
 Ftrack and RNtrack - netmail tracker (netmail manager)
 Itrack - netmail tracker (netmail manager)
 MK Message Utilities - convert between JAM and other message base formats
 MNTrack - netmail tracker (netmail manager)
 NetMgr 1.00 - netmail manager
 The NetMail Importer (NetImp)
 Y2Ktool - Fido Year 2000 Tools Rel. 6

Mail tools and utility software 
(this software fills some other utilitarian need not covered in another category listing)
(some of this software is listed here because it hasn't been categorized)
 AMC
 Fidonet Awk Utility
 FMACopy
 MailBox 1.05
 MessageBase Reporter
 MSGRA
 MSGRead 2.20
 OM and OMlite
 RACD
 SHUT UP AND RUN THE MAIL
 VPJAM
 XSH

Other JAM capable software 
 JamNNTPd - Jam based NNTP server, uses the JAM message format
 Message Base Spy - message base research, troubleshooting and development tool

See also 
Squish

References

External links 
 JAM Compatible software from the BBS Archives
 JAMLib v1.3 C library - branch split from SourceForge - maintained by Johan Billing
 JAMLib v1.4 C library - shared library version - maintained by Sir Raorn
 dissent612.com
 bsdg.org

Bulletin board system software
DOS software
FidoNet